, is a small island located off Yokosuka, Kanagawa in Japan. It is the only natural island in Tokyo Bay. Sarushima was used as a battery by the Tokugawa shogunate during the Edo period, and after the Meiji Restoration in 1868, the island was developed as part of the Yokosuka Navy Yard.

Matthew C. Perry named the island Perry Island in 1853.

Sarushima Park
Sarushima is now uninhabited, and after World War II, it was developed as a marine park. Swimming and camping facilities were built on Sarushima, which makes it a popular fishing spot. The highest part of the island is still surrounded by a stone wall from the pre-war period, and features the remains of red brick barracks and a powder magazine. The island is accessible by a ferry.

Gallery

References

External links
 Sarushima Island
 City of Yokosuka sightseeing information
 Sarushima: Welcome to Monkey Island CNN Travel article, April 2010

Tourist attractions in Kanagawa Prefecture
Islands of Kanagawa Prefecture
Nichiren